Philip John Holmes (born May 24, 1945) is the Eugene Higgins Professor of Mechanical and Aerospace Engineering at Princeton University.  As a member of the Mechanical and Aerospace Engineering department, he formerly served as the interim chair until May 2007.

Before moving to Princeton in 1994 he taught theoretical and applied mechanics at Cornell University from 1977 until 1994, when he was the Charles N. Mellowes Professor of Engineering and Professor of Mathematics.

Holmes was educated in England at the University of Oxford, where he studied engineering from 1964 to 1967, and at the University of Southampton, where he obtained a Ph.D. in engineering in 1974.
He has made solid contributions to the field of nonlinear dynamics and differential equations. His book on dynamical systems with  John Guckenheimer is a landmark in the field. Holmes is a very creative researcher and scientist and an outstanding lecturer. The sheer breadth of his contributions to applied mathematics is illustrated by the different topics on which he published books: apart from the aforementioned book, he published a book on turbulence with John L. Lumley and Gahl Berkooz, as well as a book on knots and links in dynamical systems with Robert Ghrist and Michael C. Sullivan, and a book about celestial mechanics with Florin Diacu.

He was elected a fellow of the American Academy of Arts and Sciences in 1994. In  2001 he was elected an honorary member of the Hungarian Academy of Sciences. In 2006 he was elected a fellow of the American Physical Society, and in 2012 he was elected a fellow of the American Mathematical Society.

He also has published several collections of poetry. Among them his 1986 award-winning collection ‘The Green Road’.

Books

References

External links
  Home page at Princeton

1945 births
Living people
20th-century American mathematicians
21st-century American mathematicians
Cornell University faculty
Princeton University faculty
21st-century American engineers
Fellows of the American Mathematical Society
Fellows of the Society for Industrial and Applied Mathematics
Alumni of the University of Oxford
Alumni of the University of Southampton